The 2000 All-Ireland Senior Camogie Championship—known as the Foras na Gaeilge (formerly Bórd na Gaeilge) All-Ireland Senior Camogie Championship for sponsorship reasons—was the high point of the 2000 season. The championship was won by Tipperary who achieved a second successive title beating Cork by a five-point margin in the final. The attendance was 12,880, second highest in the history of the sport of camogie at that time.

Birth of a rivalry
This and subsequent finals between the two counties was a high point in a period of rapid growth in the popularity of the sport of camogie which quadrupled the average attendance at its finals in a ten-year period. “It was unquestionably a day on which the profile of the game soared and many players produced moments of individual brilliance.,” Pat Roche wrote in the Irish Times.

Early rounds
Cork beat Kilkenny by 2-10 to 1-12 in the quarter-finals, Tipperary beat Clare 4-15 to 0-5, Galway beat Limerick 4-13 to 1-8  and Wexford beat Dublin 4-12 to 0-6. Cork easily defeated Wexford keeping them scoreless until just before the half-time whistle, in the semi-final. A goal by Noelle Kennedy proved to be the turning point of the second semi-final in which Tipperary beat Galway 2-11 to 1-8.

Final
Unusually Tipperary were favourites for the final. By the 17th minute they led by 2-4 to 0-2. Deirdre Hughes was quickly on to a sideline cut by Emily Hayden before netting off a post for the opening goal after four minutes. Within two minutes she palmed the ball to the Cork net to finish off an astute centre from the 14-year-old Claire Grogan. Cork's goal in reply came too late from Una O'Donoghue.

Final stages

References

External links

2000
2000
All-Ireland Senior Camogie Championship